TCG Mauvenet may refer to one of the following ships of the Turkish Navy:

 , a destroyer of the Ottoman Navy that entered service in 1910; transferred to the Turkish Navy upon that navy's creation; taken out of service in 1923; scrapped, 1953
 , a  ordered from the United Kingdom just prior to World War II; after the outbreak of that war, ship was purchased by the Royal Navy and renamed ; transferred to the Turkish Navy in 1946 with name restored to Mauvenet
 , the former American  destroyer minelayer , transferred to the Turkish Navy in 1971; struck by two missiles fired from  during an exercise in Saros Bay, Turkey, in 1992; scrapped, 1993
 , the former American  ; given to Turkey by the United States Navy as restitution for wrecking the previous Muavenet

Turkish Navy ship names